Mariano Matamoros (aka Villa Matamoros or simply Matamoros) is a town and seat of the municipality of Matamoros, in the northern Mexican state of Chihuahua. As of 2010, the town had a population of 2,615, up from 2,256 as of 2005.

References

Populated places in Chihuahua (state)